Conus parvatus is a species of sea snail, a marine gastropod mollusk in the family Conidae, the cone snails and their allies.

Like all species within the genus Conus, these snails are predatory and venomous. They are capable of "stinging" humans, therefore live ones should be handled carefully or not at all.

The subspecies Conus parvatus sharmiensis Wils, 1986 is a synonym of Conus parvatus Walls, 1979

Description
The size of the shell varies between 10 mm and 30 mm.

Distribution
This marine species occurs in the Red Sea, the Mascarene Basin, off North Transkei, off Western Thailand, Indian Ocean Maldives.

References

 Petit, R. E. (2009). George Brettingham Sowerby, I, II & III: their conchological publications and molluscan taxa. Zootaxa. 2189: 1–218
 Puillandre N., Duda T.F., Meyer C., Olivera B.M. & Bouchet P. (2015). One, four or 100 genera? A new classification of the cone snails. Journal of Molluscan Studies. 81: 1–23

External links
 The Conus Biodiversity website
 Cone Shells - Knights of the Sea
 

parvatus
Gastropods described in 1979